Divya Prabha Eye Hospital (established in 1998) is in Trivandrum, capital of Kerala, India.

Dr. Suseela Prabhakaran, the founder Director of the Regional Institute of Ophthalmology, Thiruvananthapuram, Kerala State, India, founded the hospital. Initially started as a small eye clinic, Divya Prabha has now grown to a full-fledged eye hospital with a modern operation theatre complex and inpatient facility.

Community program
The hospital is sponsoring cataract surgery at subsidised rates for people from low financial background. Under the Dr. N. Prabhakaran Memorial Eye Camp Scheme the hospital will be sponsoring two cataract surgeries per week at a subsidised rate. The hospital does not discriminate patients depending upon the financial status and aims at providing a single standard of eye care.

Affiliations
The hospital is recognised by Ministry of Defence, Ministry of Space and Technology Government of India to provide cashless treatment for their employees.

The hospital is also in the panel of 
 ECHS scheme of Ministry of Defence, Government of India 
 CGHS for central government employees
 CHS for VSSC employees, Ministry of Space and Technology, Government of India
 RSBY scheme of Government of Kerala 
 Ayushman Bharat scheme of Government of India
 TTK healthcare services
 Mediassist
 FHPL
 Star Health Insurance

Certifications 
The hospital is certified by:
 NABH entry level 
 ISO 9001:2015
 Kayakalp

Awards 
The hospital has won the following awards:
 Best Doctor Award 2013 to Dr. Devin Prabhakar MS, FRCS by Government of Kerala
 IMA Lifetime achievement award to Dr. Suseela Prabhakaran.

Management 
Dr. Suseela Prabhakaran, Managing Director
 Dr. Devin Prabhakar MS, FRCS Director
 Dr. Kavitha Anilkumar Resident Medical Officer

Newspaper articles

References

External links
Official Website
Profile in Trivandrum Business Directory

Hospitals in Thiruvananthapuram
Eye hospitals in India
Hospitals established in 1998
1998 establishments in Kerala